Hall & Dods was an architectural partnership in Brisbane, Queensland, Australia. The partners were Francis Richard Hall and Robin Dods and the partnership lasted from 1896 to 1913.

Works
Works of the partnership include:
 Australian Mercantile Land & Finance Woolstores (1912)
 Mount Carmel Convent (1915)

References

External links 
 Hall & Dods: Designing Queensland album of architectural plans on Flickr, by State Library of Queensland.
 Hall & Dods architectural drawings: conservation and digitisation, at State Library of Queensland.

Architects from Brisbane